PIED PIPER is the fifteenth studio album by the pillows, released on June 25, 2008. It includes the singles "Ladybird Girl", "Tokyo Bambi", and "New Animal" as well as the b-side "Across the Metropolis".

Tracks 
 PIED PIPER
 New Animal
 No Surrender
 Last Holiday
 Tokyo Zombie (The knock came at dead of night)
 Across the metropolis
 Purple Apple
 Tokyo Bambi
 Ladybird Girl
 That's a wonderful world (song for Hermit)
 POISON ROCK'N'ROLL

Chart performance 

2008 albums
The Pillows albums